The 1928–29 United States collegiate men's ice hockey season was the 35th season of collegiate ice hockey in the United States.

Regular season

Standings

Awards

References

1928–29 NCAA Standings

External links
College Hockey Historical Archives

1928–29 United States collegiate men's ice hockey season
College